Hating America may refer to:

 Anti-Americanism, the hate, dislike of, or, opposition to, the governmental policies of the United States of America
 Hating America: A History, a 2004 book by Barry Rubin 
 Hating America: The New World Sport, a 2004 book by John Gibson